The Shedd-Dunn House is a historic house in Columbus, Ohio, United States. The house was built in 1888 and was listed on the National Register of Historic Places in 1986. The Shedd-Dunn House was built at a time when East Broad Street was a tree-lined avenue featuring the most ornate houses in Columbus; the house reflects the character of the area at the time. The building is also part of the 18th & E. Broad Historic District on the Columbus Register of Historic Properties, added to the register in 1988.

The house was built for the Shedd family, who operated an early wholesale grocery. The family lived there until 1912; Eggleston Dunn of the Dunn-Taft Dry Goods Co. subsequently lived there until the early 1940s. The house then became used for commercial purposes, including office space for the architects Tibbals, Crumley and Musson.

See also
 National Register of Historic Places listings in Columbus, Ohio

References

External links

Houses completed in 1888
National Register of Historic Places in Columbus, Ohio
Houses in Columbus, Ohio
Houses on the National Register of Historic Places in Ohio
Columbus Register properties
Queen Anne architecture in Ohio
Broad Street (Columbus, Ohio)